Government Polytechnic Patna-7 (GPP7 – 118)  is one of the oldest technical education institutes in Bihar, situated in Gulzarbagh, Patna near Gaighat, Patna. It was established by the Government of Bihar under the Department of Science and Technology.
It is affiliated with the State Board of Technical Education Bihar, and approved and recognised by  the AICTE. The institute is financially supported by the Government of Bihar. The institute started its first academic session in 1954. Since its establishment, this Polytechnic institute has provided the Diploma in engineering in various branches of engineering.

Branches
The institute offers full-time Diplomas in following branches:
Civil engineering
Mechanical engineering
Electrical engineering
Textile engineering
Printing technology
Ceramics engineering
Computer science and engineering
Electronics engineering

Admission
Successful candidates obtain admission after allotment by the final merit list in the DCECE Entrance Examination conducted by BCECEB, Patna.

Institution facilities
The institute offers facilities including a library, workshop, and practical laboratories. Hostels are available to house both men and women separately.
The Wi-Fi campus is available exclusively for office use.

References

Gallery

Polytechnic institutes in Bihar
Educational institutions in India
1954 establishments in Bihar
Educational institutions established in 1954